Crookes is a suburb of Sheffield, England; also:.

Crookes may also refer to:
 Crookes (ward), an electoral ward in Sheffield, England
 Crookes Cemetery, a cemetery in Sheffield
 Crookes Valley Park, a public park in Sheffield
 Crookes (crater), a lunar crater
 The Crookes, a pop music band
 Crookes tube, an experimental electrical discharge tube
 Crookes radiometer
 The Crookes (film), a 1974 Iranian Persian-genre crime film

People
Crookes (surname)

See also
 Crook (disambiguation)
 Crooke